Bump! is a Canadian travel documentary television series that premiered in 2004 and originally airs on OutTV in Canada. The program targets an LGBT audience. Currently, Bump! is hosted by Deb Pearce and Charlie David; David joined as host with the start of Season 2. It is produced by Canadian media company, Bumper 2 Bumper Media, an exclusive partnership between Canada's Pink Triangle Press and Peace Point Entertainment Group.

International broadcasters

References

External links

OutTV (Canadian TV channel) original programming
Canadian travel television series
2004 Canadian television series debuts
2000s Canadian LGBT-related television series